The Central District of Zabol County is a district (bakhsh) in Zabol County, Sistan and Baluchestan province, Iran. At the 2006 census, its population was 160,295, in 34,555 families.  At the 2016 census, its population was 151,078. The district has two cities: Zabol and Bonjar. The district has two rural districts (dehestan): Bonjar Rural District and Heydarabad Rural District.

References 

Zabol County
Districts of Sistan and Baluchestan Province
Populated places in Zabol County